Józefa Ledwig-Bęben (born 18 April 1935) is a former Polish volleyball player, a member of Poland women's national volleyball team in 1959–1970, a bronze medalist of the Olympic Games (Tokyo 1964, Mexico 1968), a bronze medalist of the World Championship 1962 and silver medalist of the European Championship (1963, 1967), three-time Polish Champion (1967, 1969, 1970).

References
 

1935 births
Living people
Olympic volleyball players of Poland
Volleyball players at the 1964 Summer Olympics
Volleyball players at the 1968 Summer Olympics
Olympic bronze medalists for Poland
Polish women's volleyball players
Olympic medalists in volleyball
People from Tarnów County
Sportspeople from Lesser Poland Voivodeship
Medalists at the 1968 Summer Olympics
Medalists at the 1964 Summer Olympics